Yael Sherer (born 5 October 1982) is an Israeli social activist, documentary director, journalist and writer.

She directed the film "Dirty Laundry", which tells her personal story. The film presented the process she went through after deciding to file a precedential civil lawsuit against her father, who was convicted of sexually abusing her in her youth. Sherer was the CEO of the "One out of One" association. In August 2019, she founded the lobby to fight sexual violence.

Life 
Sherer was born and raised in the settlement of Kochav Yair, and moved to Kfar Saba when she was 15 years old. She served in the Education Corps as an education officer in the IOSH division, and then in the headquarters of the Chief Education Officer in Tel Hashomer.

She worked in East Africa, mainly in Tanzania, with international aid organizations, with the aim of promoting the issue of human and child rights in Africa. She also served as a journalist in South Africa for Israeli media.

In 2006, Sherer began to study cinema at the Menasher Art School. She later visited Zambia, Malawi, Lesotho, South Africa and Namibia, and wrote for "Another Journey", "Live Newspaper", and for the websites "Onlife," "Salon" and "The Hottest Place in Hell". At the same time, poems penned by Ata were published in literary journal, מאזנים .

Sherer graduated from the Open University.

From 2016 to January 2018, she was a reporter for Yediot Communications in Kfar Saba.

Sherer chose not to have children, but decided to donate eggs for women undergoing fertility treatments.

In April 2022, she was chosen to light a torch at the torch lighting ceremony on the 74th Independence Day.

References

External links 

 Official website

1982 births
Israeli journalists
Living people